Cem Boyner (born September 23, 1955) is a Turkish businessman in the textile industry, owner of department stores, and was a short-time politician.

Early life and education
Cem Boyner was born on September 3, 1955 in Istanbul to Osman Boyner, a textile industrialist from Tosya. After graduating from Robert College, he studied at Boğaziçi University and earned a Bachelor's degree in Business Administration.

Career
In 1978, he was appointed the chairman of the board of the family-owned textile company Altınyıldız and of the Boyner department stores. Currently, he is the CEO of Boyner Holding.

He served as chairman of Turkish Industrialists' and Businessmen's Association (TÜSİAD), the top business association of Turkey, in the 1989-1990 term. In a recent interview for the Creating Emerging Markets project at the Harvard Business School, he describes how he introduced the Advantage Card, which revolutionized the way retail was being conducted in Turkey.

Cem Boyner got interested in politics in 1990s. He founded a liberal-leaning political party, the New Democracy Movement (YDH), and was elected its leader. The party participated in the 1995 general elections. The YDH was not able to enter the parliament, by gaining only 0.48% of the total votes. In 1996, he quit politics due to the poor outcome at the elections.

Family life
Cem Boyner was previously married to Bilgün Sazak, the daughter of the assassinated politician Gün Sazak. From this marriage, he had three daughters, Emine (b. March 16, 1989), and the twins Elif and Ayşe (b. March 6, 1985). Cem Boyner made his second marriage with Ümit Boyner, with whom he had a son, Murat (b. February 14, 1996).

Hobbies
After leaving politics, Cem Boyner developed an interest in underwater photography. He exhibited his photographs taken under water while touring around the world. He collected his safari photographs, taken in Africa and exhibited in 2005, in a book titled Yakındaki Uzak Uzaktaki Yakın (The Near Distant / The Distant Near).

He is also an amateur kickboxing practitioner.

Books
Demokrasinin İçyüzü (1975)
Yakındaki Uzak Uzaktaki Yakın

References

1955 births
Businesspeople from Istanbul
Robert College alumni
Boğaziçi University alumni
Leaders of political parties in Turkey
Living people
Turkish business executives
Turkish political party founders
20th-century Turkish businesspeople
21st-century Turkish businesspeople
20th-century Turkish politicians